The soil-plant-atmosphere continuum (SPAC) is the pathway for water moving from soil through plants to the atmosphere. Continuum in the description highlights the continuous nature of water connection through the pathway. The low water potential of the atmosphere, and relatively higher (i.e. less negative) water potential inside leaves, leads to a diffusion gradient across the stomatal pores of leaves, drawing water out of the leaves as vapour. As water vapour transpires out of the leaf, further water molecules evaporate off the surface of mesophyll cells to replace the lost molecules since water in the air inside leaves is maintained at saturation vapour pressure. Water lost at the surface of cells is replaced by water from the xylem, which due to the cohesion-tension properties of water in the xylem of plants pulls additional water molecules through the xylem from the roots toward the leaf.

Components
The transport of water along this pathway occurs in components, variously defined among scientific disciplines:
 Soil physics characterizes water in soil in terms of tension, 
 Physiology of plants and animals characterizes water in organisms in terms of diffusion pressure deficit, and
 Meteorology uses vapour pressure or relative humidity to characterize atmospheric water. 

SPAC integrates these components and is defined as a:
	
...concept recognising that the field with all its components (soil, plant, animals and the ambient atmosphere taken together) constitutes a physically integrated, dynamic system in which the various flow processes involving energy and matter occur simultaneously and independently like links in the chain. 
 

This characterises the state of water in different components of the SPAC as expressions of the energy level or water potential of each. Modelling of water transport between components relies on SPAC, as do studies of water potential gradients between segments.

See also
 Ecohydrology
 Evapotranspiration
 Hydraulic redistribution; a parameter now being considered in the soil-plant-atmosphere modeling community
 Transpiration stream

References

Climatology
Ecological processes
Hydrology
Soil physics
Water and the environment
Plant physiology